Sant'Andrea Apostolo dello lonio is a comune and town in the province of Catanzaro in the Calabria region of Italy.

Geography

The town of Sant'Andrea is bordered by the river Alaca to the north, the Ionian Sea to the east, the river Salùbro in the south, and the foothills of the Calabrian Apennines in the west. The village lies in the hills of La Maddalena and Lipantana Cerasia. Sant'Andrea municipal hall sits at an elevation of 330 meters above sea level.

References

Cities and towns in Calabria